Portrait of Federico II Gonzaga (c. 1529) is a painting by Titian, who signed it Ticianus f.. Today in the Museo del Prado, Madrid, it portrays Federico II, Duke of Mantua who married in 1529; the portrait may have been commissioned for the occasion. The dog, a Maltese, is a symbol of faithfulness.

The work is mentioned in a 1666 inventory of the  Royal Alcázar of Madrid, coming from the collection of the Marquess of Leganés. Previous owners included Charles I of England, who purchased many paintings from the Gonzaga collection.

See also
Portrait of Francesco Gonzaga

References

General references

External links
Page at museum's website 

1529 paintings
Federico II Gonzaga
Paintings by Titian in the Museo del Prado
Dogs in paintings by Titian
Gonzaga art collection